Cassie Bradley (born 18 November 1993) is an English actress raised in Nottingham & Mansfield known for her work with Sam Mendes and Marianne Elliott at the National Theatre and her screen appearances on BBC, ITV and Channel 5 including Coronation Street  Torvill and Dean and McDonald & Dodds.

References

External links
 

1993 births
Living people
Actors from Nottingham
People from Mansfield
English television actresses
English soap opera actresses
21st-century English actresses